The Embassy of Mozambique in Washington, D.C. is the diplomatic mission of the Republic of Mozambique to the United States. The embassy is located at 1525 New Hampshire Avenue, Northwest, Washington, D.C., in the Dupont Circle neighborhood. 

The Ambassador of Mozambique to the United States is Carlos Dos Santos.

Building
Constructed in 1895 for Rear Admiral Bartlett J. Cromwell, the Richardsonian Romanesque building is a contributing property to the Dupont Circle Historic District, and valued at $2,770,770. 

Notable past owners of the building include the government of Slovenia (former embassy), the Environmental Action Foundation (later known as Environmental Action, Inc.), and the US Association for the Club of Rome.

See also
 Mozambique – United States relations
 List of Washington, D.C. embassies

References

External links

Official website
wikimapia

Washington, D.C.
Mozambique
Mozambique–United States relations
Dupont Circle